Utricularia pachyceras is a terrestrial carnivorous plant that belongs to the genus Utricularia (family Lentibulariaceae). It is endemic to Western Australia and the Northern Territory.

See also 
 List of Utricularia species

References 

Carnivorous plants of Australia
Flora of the Northern Territory
Eudicots of Western Australia
singeriana
Lamiales of Australia
Taxa named by Ferdinand von Mueller